The New Despair is the 1997 debut album by The Gothic Archies.

Track listing

External links
Lyrics and chords to The New Despair

References

1997 debut albums
The Gothic Archies albums